The Sardinian regional election of 1979 took place on 17 June 1979.

Two more seats were added.

After the election Alessandro Ghinami, member of the Italian Democratic Socialist Party formed a government which included Christian Democracy and the Italian Socialist Party. However, as soon as in 1980 the Socialists and the Democratic Socialists switched sides and formed a new coalition with the Italian Communist Party and the Sardinian Action Party. The government was led by Socialist Francesco Rais (1980–1982) and Sardist Mario Melis (1982). In 1982 the Christian Democrats returned at the head of the regional government with Angelo Rojch as President, in coalition with the Socialists, the Democratic Socialists and the Italian Republican Party.

Results

Sources: Regional Council of Sardinia and Istituto Cattaneo

References

Elections in Sardinia
1979 elections in Italy
June 1979 events in Europe